Attorney General Wallace may refer to:

James Wallace (British politician) (1729–1783), Attorney General for England and Wales
William T. Wallace (1828–1909), Attorney General of California

See also
General Wallace (disambiguation)